San Donato Milanese railway station is a railway station in Italy. Located on the Milan–Bologna railway, it serves the town of San Donato Milanese.

Services 
San Donato Milanese is served by lines S1 and S12 of the Milan suburban railway service, operated by the Lombard railway company Trenord.

See also 
 Milan suburban railway service

References

External links 

Railway stations in Lombardy
Milan S Lines stations
Railway stations opened in 2003